Per Olof Håkansson (11 May 1941 in Trelleborg – 29 August 2000 in Trelleborg) was a Swedish politician of the Swedish Social Democratic Party, who served as a member of the Swedish parliament, the Riksdag, from 1974 to 1998. He represented the constituency of southern Malmöhus County. He served as President of the Nordic Council in 1994.

References

1941 births
2000 deaths
Members of the Riksdag from the Social Democrats
People from Trelleborg
20th-century Swedish people